Aussie Gold Hunters is an Australian factual television show which follows crews of gold prospectors in Australia. The series is produced by Electric Pictures and began on the Discovery Channel on 15 September 2016. The series has been a ratings success and gone on to air in 125 countries including the United Kingdom.

In August 2022 the series was renewed for a eighth and ninth season, with season eight to premiere in 2023. Season seven concluded on 13 October 2022.

Premise 
The series follows gold miners in various locations of Western Australia, Victoria and Queensland as they strive to reach their individually set season target (measured in troy ounces of gold). They use a variety of mining techniques including use of metal detectors of surface or excavated soil for gold nuggets; and sluicing, dry blowing or heap leaching for gold particles.

Production 
The first season of eight episodes produced by Electric Pictures premiered on 15 September 2016. In March 2017 the series was renewed for a 10 episode second season, which premiered on 6 July 2017. In March 2018 the series was renewed for a 13 episode third season, which premiered on 31 May 2018. In September 2018 the series was renewed for a 13 episode fourth season, which premiered on 2 May 2019.
In October 2019 the series was renewed for 40 episodes across two seasons. The 20 episode fifth season premiered on 30 April 2020. Following the conclusion of the fifth season, three  specials featuring highlights from the five seasons premiered on 17 September 2020. The sixth season initially premiered in the United Kingdom on Discovery+ on 22 February 2021 before premiering in Australia on Discovery Channel on 29 April 2021. In April 2021 it was announced the series had been renewed for a seventh and eighth season. The seventh season premiered on 2 June 2022. In August 2022, Warner Bros Discovery UK announced the series was renewed for an additional two series, with the eighth and ninth seasons to premiere in 2023 and 2024 respectively. The eighth season will see the return of six teams and the addition of two new teams.

Cast 

Not all the miners featured on the show are Australian. Lindsay Ironside was imported from Canada by Vernon Strange. Henri Chassaing came from Switzerland.

Episodes

Season 1 (2016)

Season 2 (2017)

Season 3 (2018)

Season 4 (2019)

Season 5 (2020)

Specials

Season 6 (2021)

Season 7 (2022)

Parker's Trail crossover 
In 2020, season four of Gold Rush: Parker's Trail featured gold mining in the states of Victoria, Queensland, and Western Australia. The season saw former Aussie Gold Hunters' cast member Tyler Mahoney in a main role. There were also guest appearances by former cast members Jake Larsen demonstrating heap leaching, as well as Ted and Lecky Mahoney teaching the process of pegging land leases.

Reception 
The series has been a domestic and international ratings success. The series has been the #1 factual program on Foxtel for four consecutive years from 2017 to 2020. In addition, in the United Kingdom where the series is broadcast on Quest Aussie Gold Hunters is consistently the channel's top rating show of the week as well as frequently ranking in the top 10 of non-public broadcasting shows.

Broadcast 
As of May 2020, Aussie Gold Hunters has been broadcast in 125 countries with an estimated reach of 40 million viewers.

See also

 Gold Rush (TV series), a similar show set in Canada and Alaska
 Yukon Gold (TV series), a similar show set in Canada

References

External links

Australian factual television series
2016 Australian television series debuts
English-language television shows
Television shows set in Western Australia
Television shows set in Victoria (Australia)
Television shows set in Sydney
Television series by Electric Pictures
Discovery Channel original programming